This is the list of All-Ireland Senior Hurling Championship winning captains for 
the hurling sports competition in Ireland. Each team has one captain. In many counties the captain is chosen by the club that won the Senior County Hurling Championship in the previous year. In recent years, this practice is being replaced by the manager picking one of the more experienced players to take this role. The captain accepts the cup on behalf of the team and makes a speech in which he thanks all who helped in the success of the team.

List of captains

Records

See also
Liam MacCarthy Cup
List of All-Ireland Senior Football Championship winning captains

Captains
+All-Ireland Senior Hurling Championship